Reggie Stephens may refer to:

Reggie Stephens (offensive lineman), American football offensive lineman
Reggie Stephens (cornerback), American football cornerback